The 2008 Norwegian Football Cup was the 103rd season of Norwegian annual knockout football tournament. The competition started on 10 May 2008 with the first-round games and ended on 9 November 2008 with the final. The defending champions were Lillestrøm.

The format of the Cup has not changed for this season what means that, unlike other European cup competitions, all teams (including Tippeligaen ones) entered the Cup in the First Round. In the First and Second Round amateur teams (or at least lower-placed at the time of the draw) were seeded and played the matches at home ground. From the Third Round until the end the draw was random.

The winners, Vålerenga, qualified for the third qualifying round of the 2009–10 UEFA Europa League.

Calendar
Below are the dates for each round as given by the official schedule:

First round
The games were played on 10 and 12 May 2008.

|colspan="3" style="background-color:#97DEFF"|10 May 2008

|-
|colspan="3" style="background-color:#97DEFF"|12 May 2008

|}

Second round
The games were played between 3 and 8 June 2008.

|colspan="3" style="background-color:#97DEFF"|3 June 2008

|-
|colspan="3" style="background-color:#97DEFF"|4 June 2008

|-
|colspan="3" style="background-color:#97DEFF"|5 June 2008

|-
|colspan="3" style="background-color:#97DEFF"|7 June 2008

|-
|colspan="3" style="background-color:#97DEFF"|8 June 2008

|}

Third round
The games were played between 1 and 9 July 2008.

|colspan="3" style="background-color:#97DEFF"|1 July 2008

|-
|colspan="3" style="background-color:#97DEFF"|2 July 2008

|-
|colspan="3" style="background-color:#97DEFF"|3 July 2008

|}

Fourth round
The games were played between 23 July and 6 August 2008.

|colspan="3" style="background-color:#97DEFF"|23 July 2008

|-
|colspan="3" style="background-color:#97DEFF"|24 July 2008

|-
|colspan="3" style="background-color:#97DEFF"|30 July 2008

|-
|colspan="3" style="background-color:#97DEFF"|6 August 2008

|}

Quarter-finals

Semi-finals

Final

References

External links
 Official site 
 nrksport.no 
 speaker.no 

 
Norwegian Football Cup seasons
Cup
Norway